Claire G. Coleman (born 1974) is a Wirlomin-Noongar-Australian writer and poet, whose 2017 debut novel, Terra Nullius won the Norma K Hemming Award. The first draft of resulted in Coleman being awarded the State Library of Queensland's 2016 black&write! Indigenous Writing Fellowship.

She gave the Loris Williams Memorial Lecture at the 2018 Australian Society of Archivists conference. Coleman's essay, After the Grog War, was shortlisted for the 2018 Horne Prize, while another essay, Hidden in Plain Sight, was shortlisted for the 2019 Horne Prize.

Works

Novels

Short fiction

Poetry

Non-fiction

Awards
 2017 Aurealis Award for best science fiction novel shortlist for Terra Nullius
 2018 Horne Prize shortlist for "After the Grog War"
 2018 MUD Literary Prize finalist for Terra Nullius
 2018 Stella Prize shortlist for Terra Nullius
 2019 Horne Prize shortlist for "Hidden in Plain Sight" 
 2019 Neukom Institute Literary Arts Awards Debut shortlist for Terra Nullius
 2019 Queensland Poetry Festival Philip Bacon Ekphrasis Award for "Pelin"
 2020 Peter Porter Poetry Prize shortlist for "That Wadjela Tongue"
 2020 Oodgeroo Noonuccal Indigenous Poetry Prize shortlist
 2022 Queensland Literary Awards The University of Queensland Non-Fiction Book Award for Lies, Damned Lies

References

External links 
 
 
 Coleman's works at GoodReads
 "The Mists Of Down Below" in Griffith Review

Living people
Noongar people
21st-century Australian novelists
21st-century Australian poets
Australian women novelists
Australian women poets
Indigenous Australian writers
21st-century Australian women writers
1974 births